East-Asian Planet Search Network, (EAPSNET), is an international collaboration between China, Japan, and Korea. Each facility, BOAO (Korea), Xinglong (China), and OAO (Japan), has a 2m class telescope, a high dispersion echelle spectrograph, and an iodine absorption cell for precise RV measurements, looking for extrasolar planets.

Discovery

NOTE:  HD 119445b is a brown dwarf candidate.

References

Exoplanet search projects
Science and technology in East Asia